K129 or K-129 may refer to:

K-129 (1947–1966 Kansas highway), a former state highway in Kansas
K-129 (1980–1997 Kansas highway), a former state highway in Kansas
Soviet submarine K-129 (1960), a Soviet Union submarine
Symphony No. 17 (Mozart) in G major by Mozart, K.129